is a Japanese actress and singer. Tahara is represented with Stardust Promotion. She won the Miss Magazine 2011 Second Grand Prix. Tahara's father is singer Toshihiko Tahara, and her mother is former CanCam model Ayako Mukaida.

Works

Singles (internet)

DVD

Filmography

TV dramas

Films

Dramas

Advertisements

Music videos

Magazines

Internet

References

External links
 
 – Line 

Japanese gravure idols
Japanese television personalities
21st-century Japanese actresses
Singers from Tokyo
Stardust Promotion artists
1994 births
Living people
21st-century Japanese singers
21st-century Japanese women singers